Village Sahib Khan Jamali ڳوٺ صاحب خان جمالي Sakrand Sindh Pakistan is a historical and well-known village of UC Karam Jamali, Deh Mori, Talko Sakrand, Shaheed Benazir Abad District, Pakistan with a population of more than 3000 people. It was named after "Mr Sahib Khan Jamali" who built it. It is about 14 km away from Nawabshah to the South. It is approximately 150 years old. The main profession of the peoples of this village is proprietor business, farming and real estate. Languages spoken by residents are Sindhi سنڌي and Balochi بلوچي.  Village Sahib Khan Jamali is one of the most modern and prospering villages of Shaheed Benazirabad District. The area near the village is cultivated through modern agriculture machines. The village has few government schools to provide primary education to the children, but those schools are not operational, so nowadays children go to the nearest village of Wassayo Jamali to get primary education. For education above primary level, villagers send their children to Nawabshah or nearby villages. The 80% of villagers are almost not educated at all (although they have some knowledge of reading and writing). The village has no Hospital, Dispensary and water treatment plants. The main source of electricity is the Solar Panels placed on the roofs of buildings. Cricket is the favorite sport of villagers, they play and participate in the cricket tournaments. But that is a thing of past, because of social media i.e. Tiktok and YouTube, the interest in physical sports has decreased to almost none. Majority of the villagers is secular Muslim. The most-wanted job of the villagers is Teaching.

References 

Populated places in Shaheed Benazir Abad District
Villages in Sindh